Capsul is an album by New Zealand band Bailter Space. It was released in 1997.

Track listing
Shield - 03:40
Pass It Up - 03:27
So La - 03:32
Dome - 03:49
Capsule - 03:53
Tag - 04:25
Collider - 03:42
Velo - 02:42
Picking Up - 05:06
Argonaut - 06:56
II - 05:12
The Sun - 04:09
Shades - 03:03
GA 9 - 04:16

Personnel
John Halvorsen (bass guitar, vocals)
Brent McLachlan (drums, sampler)
Alister Parker (guitar, vocals, sampler)

References

Bailter Space albums
1997 albums
Flying Nun Records albums